Kokoro Fujii (藤井 快 Fujii Kokoro, born November 30, 1992) is a Japanese professional sport climber and boulderer. He has won the men's bouldering category of 2021 IFSC Climbing World Championships, multiple medals at IFSC Climbing World Cup events, finishing second overall in bouldering during the 2021 World Cup season.

Rankings

Climbing World Cup

Climbing World Championships

World Cup podiums

Bouldering

See also
List of grade milestones in rock climbing
History of rock climbing
Rankings of most career IFSC gold medals

References

External links

 Team Au profile 
 JMSCA profile  

Living people
1992 births
Japanese rock climbers
Sportspeople from Shizuoka Prefecture
People from Hamamatsu
Sport climbers at the 2018 Asian Games
Asian Games medalists in sport climbing
Asian Games silver medalists for Japan
Medalists at the 2018 Asian Games
Competitors at the 2017 World Games
Competitors at the 2022 World Games
World Games silver medalists
20th-century Japanese people
21st-century Japanese people
IFSC Climbing World Championships medalists
IFSC Climbing World Cup overall medalists
Boulder climbers